Guido Celano (19 April 1904 – 7 March 1988) was an Italian actor, voice actor and film director. He appeared in 120 films between 1931 and 1988. He also directed two Spaghetti Westerns: Cold Killer and Gun Shy Piluk. He was born in Francavilla al Mare, Italy and died in Rome, Italy.

Selected filmography

Rotaie (1929, directed by Mario Camerini)
La scala (1931, directed by Gennaro Righelli)
The Charmer (1931, directed by Guido Brignone)
The Devil's Lantern (1931)
Palio (1932, directed by Alessandro Blasetti)
The Blue Fleet (1932, directed by Gennaro Righelli)
My Little One (1933)
Squadrone bianco (1936, directed by Augusto Genina)
Music in the Square (1936, directed by Mario Mattoli)
The Black Corsair (1937, directed by Amleto Palermi)
Doctor Antonio (1937)
Giuseppe Verdi (1938)
Pietro Micca (1938)
The Silent Partner (1939)
Jeanne Doré (1939, directed by Mario Bonnard)
Le sorprese del divorzio (1939, directed by Guido Brignone)
Arditi civili (1940, directed by Domenico Gammino)
The Cavalier from Kruja (1940, directed by Carlo Campogalliani)
First Love (1941)
Fedora (1942, directed by Camillo Mastrocinque)
Don Cesare di Bazan (1942, directed by Riccardo Freda)
The Two Orphans (1942)
Sleeping Beauty (1942, directed by Luigi Chiarini)
Four Steps in the Clouds (1942, directed by Alessandro Blasetti)
Knights of the Desert (1942)
 A Living Statue (1943)
 Fatal Symphony (1947)
 Flying Squadron (1949)
Il Ladro di Venezia (1950, directed by John Brahm)
L' Amore di Norma (1950)
Il Brigante Musolino (1950)
Pact with the Devil (1950)
Peppino e Violetta (1950)
 Women and Brigands (1950)
 Without a Flag (1951)
Seven Hours of Trouble (1951, directed by Marcello Marchesi)
 Red Love (1952)
Black Feathers (1952, directed by Oreste Biancoli)
La mano dello straniero (1953, directed by Mario Soldati)
A Slice of Life (1954)
I cinque dell'Adamello (1954)
 The Boatman of Amalfi (1954)
L'ultimo amante (1955, directed by Mario Mattoli)
Don Camillo e l'onorevole Peppone (1955, directed by Carmine Gallone)
Il padrone sono me(1956', directed by Franco Brusati)
Uomini e lupi (1956, directed by Giuseppe De Santis)
Il Conte di Matera (1957)
La diga sul Pacifico (Orig.: This Angry Age) (1958, directed by René Clément)
Young Husbands (1958)
L'isola del tesoro (1959, TV Movie, directed by Anton Giulio Majano)
The Tiger of Eschnapur (1959, directed by Fritz Lang)
Il padrone delle ferriere (1959, directed by Anton Giulio Majano)
Il bell'Antonio (1960, directed by Mauro Bolognini)
Il gobbo (1960, directed by Carlo Lizzani)
La Donna dei Faraoni (AKA: The Pharaoh's Woman) (1960)
Il carabiniere a cavallo (1961, directed by Carlo Lizzani)
Barabbas (1961, directed by Richard Fleischer)
L'Immortelle (1963, directed by Alain Robbe-Grillet)
Flavia, la monaca musulmana (1974, directed by Gianfranco Mingozzi)
Lo sgarbo (1975, directed by Marino Girolami)
Sciopèn (1982, directed by Luciano Odorisio)
I due carabinieri (1984, directed by Carlo Verdone)
Via Paradiso (1988, directed by Luciano Odorisio)

References

External links

1904 births
1988 deaths
People from the Province of Chieti
Italian male film actors
Italian male voice actors
Italian film directors
20th-century Italian male actors